Les Concerts en Chine (English title: The Concerts in China) is a live album by Jean-Michel Jarre, recorded in 1981 and released in 1982 on Disques Dreyfus. It was recorded during Jarre's Concerts in China tour of Autumn 1981, which consisted of five Beijing and Shanghai concerts in China; this was the first time a Western pop artist performed in China after the Cultural Revolution.

The album is a balance of previously released tracks by Jarre, new compositions inspired by Chinese culture, and one rearranged traditional Chinese track, "Fishing Junks at Sunset" ("Jonques de pêcheurs au crépuscule").

The album consists mainly of live material, plus ambient sound recordings and one new studio track "Souvenir of China".  Other new compositions recorded live include "Nuit à Shanghai", "Harpe Laser", "Arpégiateur" and "Orient Express". "Jonques de pêcheurs au crépuscule" ("Fishing Junks at Sunset") is a new arrangement of a very old traditional Chinese song known as the "Fisherman's Chant at Dusk", which was performed and recorded with The Peking Conservatoire Symphony Orchestra and is often wrongly attributed as being composed by Jean-Michel Jarre, misled by the album inlay.

The album was originally released as a double-disc LP, then as a double-disc CD. There was also a CD release in two separate volumes, with the cover color changed to blue (Vol. 1) and yellow (Vol. 2). In 1997, a one-disc remastered CD was released, made possible by reducing the total running time to 78:17 by reducing the gaps and audience noise between tracks. The remastering was done by Scott Hull at Masterdisk to the 96 kHz, 24 bit standard.

One of the album's original tracks – "Arpégiateur" – was used in the soundtrack of the film 9½ Weeks as well as in several mid-1980s episodes of the American soap opera Santa Barbara. Opening track "The Overture" is the first movement of "Magnetic Fields Part 1" slowed down.

The album reached #6 in the UK charts #1 in Portugal and #76 in Australia.

Track listing

First edition (1982)

Second edition (1997 remaster)

Personnel 
Jean-Michel Jarre – Fairlight CMI, Eminent, Oberheim OB-Xa, Moog Taurus, EMS Synthi AKS, EMS VCS 3, Linn LM-1, Electro-Harmonix Micro Synthesizer, laser harp, Elka X-705
Frederick Rousseau – MDB Polysequencer, RSF Kobol, Yamaha CS-60, Korg Rhythm, ARP 2600
 Dominique Perrier – Moog Liberation, Sequential Circuits Prophet-5, Eminent, Korg Polyphonique, RSF Kobol
 Roger Rizzitelli – Electronic percussion, Simmons electronic drum

Additional personnel 

Pierre Mourey – musical instrument coordinator
Peking Conservatoire Symphony Orchestra – Chinese orchestra on "Fishing Junks at Sunset"
Huang Feili – orchestra conductor on "Fishing Junks at Sunset"
Mrs. Li Meng, Mr. Wang Zhi – collaborating artists (possibly playing guzhengs) on "Fishing Junks at Sunset"
Live recording by : René AMELINE & Patrick AUFOUR with the FLIGHT MOBILE.

Charts

Certifications

References

Further reading

External links
 Album details on Discogs.com

Jean-Michel Jarre live albums
1982 live albums